Kisobushi (in ) is a folk song originating from the Koso District of Nagano Prefecture, Japan.  It sings about the river, mountains and people who live there.

General
Kisobushi is a folk song originating from the Koso District of Nagano Prefecture, Japan.  It sings about the river, mountains and people who live there. "Fushi" (in ) or "Bushi", when immediately follows another nouns, as in "Tankobushi",  means a melody or a song.

Lyrics
There are several stanzas of various versions.  The words, "Nakanori san", in the lyrics are generally agreed to mean the loggers who raft down the Kiso River, carrying the logs cut down from the woods in the Kiso Mountains.

Japanese original
木曽のナー　中乗りさん
木曽の御岳（おんたけ）さんは　ナンジャラホーイ
夏でも寒い　ヨイヨイヨイ
合唱：ヨイヨイヨイノ　ヨイヨイヨイ

袷ょ（あわしょ）ナー　中乗りさん
あわしょやりたや　ナンジャラホーイ
足袋もそえて　ヨイヨイヨイ
合唱：ハー　ヨイヨイヨイノ　ヨイヨイヨイ

...

Romanized Japanese
Kiso no nah, Nakanori san,
Kisono Ontakesan wa, nanjara hoi!
Natsu demo samui, yoi yoi yoi!
Chorus: Hah, yoi yoi yoi no, yoi yoi yoi!

Awasho nah, Nakanori san,
Awasho yaritaya, nanjara hoi!
Tabi o soete, yoi yoi yoi!
Chorus: Hah, yoi yoi yoi no, yoi yoi yoi!

...

See also
Nagano Prefecture
Kiso District, Nagano
Kiso Mountains
Kiso River

External links

Japanese folk songs
Culture in Nagano Prefecture